Dichagyris constanti is a moth of the family Noctuidae. It is found in Algeria, Morocco, south-western Europe, southern France, and northern Italy.
Warren (1914) states E. constanti Mill. (12 f) Forewing pale yellow, dusted with darker especially in median area; the lines fine ; the subterminal punctiform ; stigmata very faint ; hindwing white, with the fringe and margin yellowish.Recorded only from the Ardeche, France.

The larvae feed on various herbaceous plants.

References

External links

Image
Contribution to the knowledge of the Noctuidae from Spain. Observations and collecting trips from September 1986 till December 2001 (Lepidoptera: Noctuidae)

constanti
Moths of Europe
Moths of Africa
Moths described in 1860